Philip Phillips (11 August 1900 – 11 December 1994) was an influential archaeologist in the United States during the 20th century.   Although his first graduate work was in architecture, he later received a doctorate from Harvard University under advisor Alfred Marston Tozzer.  His first archaeological experiences were on Iroquois sites, but he specialized in the Mississippian culture, especially its Lower Mississippi Valley incarnation.

Career
In 1937, he was appointed assistant curator of Southeastern Archaeology at the Peabody Museum of Archaeology and Ethnology at Harvard.  In 1949, he became its curator; and remained an honorary curator from his 1967 retirement until his death.

His professional collaborations with James A. Ford, James Bennett Griffin, and Gordon Willey have become some of the standard works of American archaeology.

His professional obituary, including a summary of his life's accomplishments, was written by his lifelong colleague and collaborator Gordon R. Willey.  It was published in 1996 by the Society for American Archaeology.

Personal life
Phillips married Ruth Wilma Schoellkopf (daughter of business magnate Jacob F. Schoellkopf Jr.) in 1922 in Buffalo, New York. In 1942, the Phillips resided in Cambridge, Massachusetts. In 1955 their son Bradley Sawyer Phillips (1929–1991) married the poet V. R. Lang (1924–1956).

Published works
Phillips' published works include:
Brain, Jeffrey P. and Philip Phillips. 1996. Shell Gorgets: Styles of the Late Prehistoric and Protohistoric Southeast. Peabody Museum Press, Cambridge, Massachusetts.
Phillips, Philip. 1970. Archaeological Survey in the Lower Yazoo Basin, Mississippi, 1949-1955. Peabody Museum Papers, vol. 60. Harvard University, Cambridge.
Phillips, Philip and J. A. Brown. 1975-83. Pre-Columbian Shell Engravings from the Craig Mound at Spiro, Oklahoma. (6 volumes) Cambridge, Peabody Museum Press.
Phillips, Philip and J. A. Brown. 1984. Pre-Columbian Shell Engravings from the Craig Mound at Spiro, Oklahoma. (2-volume softbound edition) Cambridge, Peabody Museum Press.
Phillips, Philip, James A. Ford, and James B. Griffin. 1951. Archaeological Survey in the Lower Mississippi Alluvial Valley, 1940-1947. Peabody Museum Papers, vol. 25. Harvard University, Cambridge.
Willey, Gordon R. and Philip Phillips. 1958. Method and Theory in American Archaeology. University of Chicago Press, Chicago.

References

Willey, Gordon R. Obituary: Philip Phillips 1900-1994. American Antiquity, Vol. 61, No. 1. (Jan., 1996), pp. 39–43.

Pre-Columbian scholars
Harvard University alumni
American Mesoamericanists
Mesoamerican archaeologists
20th-century Mesoamericanists
1900 births
1994 deaths
Schoellkopf family
20th-century American archaeologists